Columbus Airport  (formerly Columbus Metropolitan Airport) is four miles northeast of Columbus, in Muscogee County, Georgia, United States. Serving Georgia's second largest city, it is Georgia's fourth busiest airport.

FAA records say the airport had 51,288 passenger boardings (enplanements) in calendar year 2008, 48,526 in 2009 and 63,726 in 2010. The National Plan of Integrated Airport Systems for 2011–2015 categorized it as a primary commercial service airport (more than 10,000 enplanements per year).

Eastern Airlines flights began about 1944, Delta arrived in 1947 and Southern in 1949; Eastern and Southern pulled out in 1979 and Delta's last mainline flights were in 1995–96.

In 1968 Southern was allowed to start nonstop DC-9s Columbus to Dulles International Airport outside of Washington, D.C., three a day, all continuing to LaGuardia Airport in New York City. The flights continued (two to four a day) until 1979.

Facilities
The airport covers 680 acres (275 ha) at an elevation of 397 feet (121 m). It has two asphalt runways: 6/24 is 6,997 by 150 feet (2,133 x 46 m) and 13/31 is 3,997 by 150 feet (1,218 x 46 m).

In 2011 the airport had 23,658 aircraft operations, average 64 per day: 80% general aviation, 16% air taxi, 2% airline, and 2% military. 133 aircraft were then based at the airport: 79% single-engine, 14% multi-engine, 6% jet, and 1% helicopter.

Airlines and destinations

Passenger

Destination statistics

Incidents

 On August 17, 1984, after stopping to refuel on a flight from Tennessee to Florida, a Mooney M20 crashed shortly after takeoff. There were four fatalities.
 On July 19, 2009, at around 6:15 pm, a Rutan VariEze crashed shortly after takeoff. The pilot was the sole occupant and was killed.

References

External links
 Columbus Airport, official website
 Aerial image as of February 1999 from USGS The National Map
 
 
 

Airports in Georgia (U.S. state)
Transportation in Columbus, Georgia
Buildings and structures in Columbus, Georgia